is a fictional character from the 2008 video game Persona 4. There, she appears as a high school student who starts investigating a dimension labeled as the TV World alongside her friends. The kidnapping of her best friend Yukiko Amagi leads Chie to join the Investigation Team in working in a murder case where the victims are sent to the TV World to be killed by creatures known as Shadows. 

Besides printed and animated adaptations of the Persona 4 game, Chie has also appeared in the fighting games Persona 4 Arena and Persona 4 Arena Ultimax, the dungeon crawler Persona Q: Shadow of the Labyrinth, and the rhythm game Persona 4: Dancing All Night. Critical reception to the character has been positive due to both of her fighting and feminine traits. However, critics were differing when commenting the English voice acting from Chie featured in the games.

Concept and characteristics
Chie is an upbeat girl with an obsession with kung fu, even using those techniques in battle. Chie serves as the player's Social Link to The Chariot; this is symbolized in the animated series by Yu's usage of the Persona . Writer Patrick Hayes stated that her Shadow "represents her desire to maintain dominance over Yukiko in their relationship as well as her jealousy of Yukiko's feminine qualities and skills." In the designing of the character, various sketches were made with some of them being reminiscent to previous Persona characters.

She is voiced by Yui Horie in Japanese. In English, she is voiced by Tracey Rooney for Persona 4, and Erin Fitzgerald provides her English voice for all other appearances. Minami Tsukui portrays her in the stage play adaptation of Persona 4. Mariya Ise was originally cast as Chie in the stage play adaptation of Persona 4 Arena, but she was replaced by Makoto Koichi following health problems and her pregnancy. A limited edition of Persona 4 Arena featured the buttons Chie wore in Persona 4 as a bonus.

Appearances
Chie first appears in the 2008 video game Persona 4, where she and her friends Yu Narukami and Yosuke Hanamura discover a world within the TV and meet a creature named Teddie and discover that someone is throwing people into the television which eventually leads to their death. Although initially reluctant, she goes into the TV world when her best friend Yukiko Amagi is thrown in, putting her in danger. There, Chie encounters her Shadow who represents her jealousy of Yukiko's feminine side and talents, as well as her wish and need to maintain control over Yukiko. With Yu and Yosuke's help, Chie confronts her other self and joins the Investigation Team. Following the encounter with her Shadow, Chie receives the Persona , a muscular female figure wearing a yellow outfit and armed with a naginata, that she uses in combat while she performs kicks. Throughout Yu's interactions with Chie (which can also be intimate), she discovers that she genuinely wanted to protect Yukiko without any underlying selfish motivations. After this, Tomoe evolves into , whose yellow jumpsuit turns black and is decked in silver samurai armor. The desire to protect people eventually inspires her to seek a career as a police officer. In the re-release Persona 4: Golden, Chie's Persona can evolve to a third level to become , which has golden armor and a long flowing cape. A promotional flash game for Persona 4 allowed players to "sneak a sexy peek" at Chie while she is in a hot springs.

She is playable in Persona 4 Arena alongside Tomoe Gozen; In Persona 4 Arena, Chie joins Yu, Yosuke and Yukiko to investigate the TV world after seeing the Midnight Channel. When she enters, she is forced to fight her friends as well as a man, Akihiko Sanada. She also appears in Persona Q: Shadow of the Labyrinth, Persona Q2: New Cinema Labyrinth, and in Persona 4: Dancing All Night. On October 20, 2017, it was confirmed by Arc System Works that Chie would appear in the upcoming fighting game BlazBlue: Cross Tag Battle. It was further confirmed on January 13, 2018 that Chie would be in the base game. Additionally, Chie is featured in the anime television series adaptation of Persona 4.

Reception
Chie Satonaka has been identified by Kat Bailey from US Gamer and Leigh Alexander from Polygon as their favorite character. Alexander cited Chie's final Social Link sequence where she "realises that dedicating yourself to personal growth is cowardice, and that it's all meaningless unless you turn around and start fighting — start /using/ this strength you've amassed." Robert Boyd, creator of Breath of Death VII and Cthulhu Saves the World, ranked Chie as the second best "JRPG warrior heroine." He justified the ranking by saying that she "kicks things to death" and called her a "great foil to the main character’s best friend, Yosuke." Chie was named GamesRadar's favourite Persona 4 character. Kotaku's Mike Fahey called Chie his favourite Persona 4 character and discussed "swoon[ing] over" her. Kotaku's Kirk Hamilton felt that Persona 4 featured more depth to its characters than its predecessor Persona 3. The writer cited Chie's "fear for her friend Yukiko and desire to be seen as feminine" as an example of this. He also compared her to Velma Dinkley from Scooby-Doo, Where Are You!

Critical reception to both of Chie's English voice actresses have been mixed. While reviewing Persona 4, IGN's Jeff Haynes felt that Tracey Rooney's delivery as Chie sounded at times like a 30-year-old woman instead of a teenager. Reviewing the same game, RPGamer's Michael Cunningham felt that Rooney felt "a little stiff" during battle lines, but was fine elsewhere. While Kotaku's Kirk Hamilton was initially reluctant about Erin Fitzgerald while reviewing Persona 4 Golden, he eventually grew to like her. VG247's Johnny Cullen expressed excitement at the prospect of Chie's playability in Persona 4 Arena. In reviewing Persona 4 Golden, Destructoid's Dale North revealed he was not a fan of Fitzgerald's voice, due in part to the fact that he preferred Yui Horie, Chie's Japanese voice actress. RPGamer's senior reviews editor Adriaan den Oueden's initial impressions of Fitzgerald in his review of the same game were positive. She was also listed as the 10th best Persona character by Kimberley Wallace from Game Informer who commented "Chie remains one of the most likable characters to date". IGN also listed her as the eighth best Persona character, praising her upbeat personality and her interests.

References

Characters designed by Shigenori Soejima
Female characters in anime and manga
Female characters in video games
Fictional characters with evocation or summoning abilities
Fictional female martial artists
Fictional high school students
Fictional Japanese people in video games
Fictional martial artists in video games
Persona 4 characters
Sega protagonists
Teenage characters in video games
Video game characters introduced in 2008
Video game characters who have mental powers